Cordia is a genus of spittlebugs belonging to the family Aphrophoridae.

Species 
Species within this genus include:

 Cordia albilatera Walker, 1851
 Cordia minuta Synave, 1954
 Cordia peragrans Stål, 1855
 Cordia rotundiceps Lallemand, 1927

References

Aphrophoridae
Auchenorrhyncha genera